Thanbyuzayat (") is a town in the Mon State of south-eastern Myanmar. It is the administrative center for Thanbyuzayat Township.

History 
The name of the town gets its name from a white tin zayat located in the town centre. The interjunction that tin zayat located was once a rest place for travellers, and the tin zayat was constructed in 1874 by a Mon lady called Mi Gee Yut. During WWII, Thanbyuzayat was just a large village within Kyaikkami township, and later gained town status.

Camp Thanbyuzayat
During World War II, Thanbyuzayat was the western terminus of the notorious Death Railway (Siam–Burma Railway) linking up with the pre-war coastal railway between Ye and Rangoon. Thanbyuzayat was also the site of a Japanese prisoner of war camp for the prisoners who worked on building the railway, The first prisoners arrived in June 1942. 13,000 prisoners passed through the camp of which at least 6,000 were Australian and 4,300 Dutch prisoners of war. From Thanbyuzayat, the prisoners were moved to work camps on the railway line. The camp was abandoned on 22 June 1943 due to continuous allied bombardment which killed 12 prisoners.

The Death Railway Museum has been established at the western terminus of the railway. In the Thanbyuzayat War Cemetery, 3,626 Allied servicemen (mostly Australian, British and Dutch) are buried. All prisoners who died on the Burma side have been re-buried at Thanbyuzayat except for the Americans who have been repatriated.

Places of  interest 
 Thanbyuzayat War Cemetery
 Death Railway Museum
 Setse beach
 Setse Agar jelly production farms
 Pa-nga salt farms
 Pa-nga Ngapi production village
 Kyaik Kohgrain Pagoda 
 Hot springs (originally built for WWII Japanese officers)
 Kyaikkhami resort town
 Kyeik Ne' Pagoda Welgalaung Village

Gallery

See also

 Death Railway
 To End All Wars (film)
 The Bridge over the River Kwai

Notes

External links

"Thanbyuzayat Map – Satellite Images of Thanbyuzayat" Maplandia World Gazetteer

 
Township capitals of Myanmar
Populated places in Mon State
World War II sites in Burma